Leave Means Leave was a pro-Brexit, Eurosceptic political pressure group organisation that campaigned and lobbied for the United Kingdom to leave the European Union following the 'Leave' result of the EU referendum on 23 June 2016. The campaign was co-chaired by British property entrepreneur Richard Tice and business consultant John Longworth. The vice-chairman was Leader of the Brexit Party, Nigel Farage.

The organisation has described itself as a ‘campaign for a clean Brexit’.

History
Co-founded by Richard Tice and John Longworth, according to the BBC, the organisation grew out of the Vote Leave campaign during the 2016 EU referendum.

The organisation was dissolved on 31 January 2020 following the withdrawal of the United Kingdom from the European Union.

Letter to the prime minister
On 30 September 2017, during the Brexit negotiations, the campaign wrote a letter to Prime Minister Theresa May. Four ex-cabinet members, including former Chancellor of the Exchequer Lord Lawson, as well as former Brexit minister David Jones, signed the letter alongside the rest of the board. The letter highlighted  concerns including support for considering a no-deal scenario.

The letter had multiple significant supporters outside of the organisation, including former Conservative leader Michael Howard, who said he shared its "aspirations".

March to Leave 
Nigel Farage and the Leave Means Leave campaign organised a march in 2019, setting off from Sunderland in the north east of England on 16 March and culminating in a rally in Parliament Square, London on 29 March, the date Brexit was originally due to occur. 

The march set off from Sunderland on Saturday 16 March 2019 with roughly 100 marchers heading to Hartlepool led by Farage. Supporters of Leave Means Leave had been asked to pay £50 to sponsor or to join the march from Sunderland to London and it had been claimed that more than 350 people had signed up although only 50 had agreed to walk for the full 14 days. The marchers did not plan to walk the whole route.

At the start of the march, Nigel Farage was quoted as saying: "We are here in the very week when parliament is doing its utmost to betray the Brexit result ... It is beginning to look like it doesn’t want to leave and the message from this march is if you think you can walk all over us we will march straight back to you.”

The following day roughly 150 marchers headed to Middlesbrough but Farage did not participate. Farage rejoined the march the following Saturday in Nottinghamshire attended by roughly 200 marchers, drawing unfavourable comparisons to the hundreds of thousands attending the anti-Brexit People's Vote March in London on the same day.

The March for Leave then proceeded through Leicestershire and Buckinghamshire with its numbers reduced to around 100.

The march was accompanied throughout by an advertising truck displaying anti-Brexit messages paid for by the Led By Donkeys campaign.

On 29 March, the march arrived in Central London, to join the Leave Means Leave rally in Parliament Square. The rally was reported to have attracted "thousands" of supporters. The Financial Times quoted their reporter Sebastian Payne as stating that the crowd size was "a couple of thousand". Speakers included Brexit Party chairman, Richard Tice, businessman John Longworth, broadcaster Julia Hartley-Brewer, Spiked editor Brendan O'Neill, Labour MP Kate Hoey, Wetherspoons founder Tim Martin, writer Claire Fox, Conservative MPs Peter Bone and Mark Francois and DUP MP Ian Paisley Jr.

A separate pro-Brexit "Make Brexit Happen" rally, organised by the UKIP party formerly led by Farage, was also held nearby.

References

Euroscepticism in the United Kingdom
2016 United Kingdom European Union membership referendum
2016 establishments in the United Kingdom
Organizations established in 2016
Brexit–related advocacy groups in the United Kingdom